The Belgrade Lakes are a chain of lakes around Belgrade, Maine. The flow sequence is from East Pond to North Pond to Great Pond to Long Pond to Messalonskee Lake and thence via Messalonskee Stream to the Kennebec River at Waterville. The lakes have long been an important resort area for fishing, boating, and swimming; and shoreline development includes residences for individuals employed in the cities of Waterville and Augusta.

East Pond
East Pond is the headwater pond of the Belgrade chain of lakes. The south end of the pond is in Oakland, and the north end of the pond in Smithfield overflows westward approximately  through the village of Smithfield into the east side of North Pond. Algal blooms have been observed since the 1990s for about a week in June and again through the last month of summer.

North Pond
Weedy North Pond covers the boundary of Smithfield to the east, Mercer to the northwest, and Rome to the southwest. It is the shallowest lake of the chain. North Pond tributaries include Sucker Brook and Clark Brook joining the overflow from East Pond, and Leech Brook, Bog Brook and Pattee Brook flowing into the north end of the pond. There is a public boat launch area near the outlet of Bog Brook. The south end of North Pond overflows through Great Meadow Stream, which forms the eastern border of Rome and western border of Oakland and Belgrade for approximately  before reaching the northwestern bay of Great Pond.

Great Pond

At , Great Pond is the largest of the Belgrade Lakes and forms the boundary between Rome to the north and Belgrade to the south. Tributaries Rome Trout Brook and Robbins Mill Stream enter the north end of Great Pond. Although Great Pond is more than twice as deep as the previous lakes in the chain, it similarly becomes uniformly warm through the summer and unsuitable for native trout or salmon.

Long Pond
The northern basin of Long Pond in Rome is of similar depth as Great Pond, but the basin forming the western boundary of Belgrade and eastern boundary of Mount Vernon south of the narrows is fifty percent deeper with cooler deep waters. There is a public boat launch area at the south end of the narrows. Tributaries Whittier Brook and Beaver Brook drain Whittier Pond, Beaver Pond, Watson Pond, Round Pond, Kidder Pond, and McIntire Pond into the northern basin of Long Pond. Stony Brook and Ingham Stream drain Moose Pond and Ingham Pond into the southern basin. Smaller tributaries like Graveyard Brook and Sandy Cove Stream drain the eastern shores of the southern basin. The south end of Long Pond overflows through Belgrade Stream and Wings Mills Dam, reaching the south end of Messalonskee Lake after flowing  eastward.

Messalonskee Lake

The north end of Messalonskee Lake overflows through Messalonskee Stream  to the Kennebec River.

Smaller ponds
The  McGrath Pond and  Salmon Pond overflow into the east side of Great Pond. They have extensive shoreline development and are sometimes called the sixth and seventh Belgrade Lakes.

Fishing
The lakes provide suitable habitat for chain pickerel, white perch, smallmouth bass and largemouth bass. Early angling focused on brook trout from the tributary brooks and Atlantic salmon in the deeper lakes; but tributaries lack sufficient spawning and nursery habitat to replace angling success. Attempts to sustain the salmon population by stocking hatchery fish caused dramatic decline in the late 1970s of the population of rainbow smelt which had been the primary prey of native salmon. Stocking then introduced brown trout with greater tolerance for warm water lake conditions. Local interests seeking alternative angling opportunities illegally introduced northern pike and black crappie. Eutrofication from residential development of the shoreline has reduced Secchi disk depth to 4 meters, and dead algae has reduced oxygen levels in deep water.

Sources

Lakes of Kennebec County, Maine
Lakes of Maine